Reichenau-Tamins railway station is a railway station in the municipality of Domat/Ems serving the communities of Reichenau and Tamins in Switzerland. It is an important station for connections between the Landquart–Thusis and the Reichenau-Tamins–Disentis/Mustér lines as it is where the two lines diverge. From this station, there are trains to Chur, Disentis, Scuol, St. Moritz and Thusis. At Chur, there are also mainline connecting services to Zürich.

Services
The following services stop at Reichenau-Tamins:

 Regio: limited service between Disentis/Mustér or St. Moritz and Chur or Scuol-Tarasp.
 Chur S-Bahn:
 : hourly service between Rhäzüns and Schiers.
 : hourly service between Thusis and Chur.

References

External links
 
 

Railway stations in Graubünden
Rhaetian Railway stations
Railway stations in Switzerland opened in 1903